Anjunabeats  is a British record label started by producers Jonathan "Jono" Grant and Paavo Siljamäki of Above & Beyond in 2000. Initially exclusively a trance music label, around 2011 Anjunabeats started releasing primarily trance-edged house. The name Anjuna comes from the name of a beach in Goa, India.

History
In 2000, Anjunabeats released its first 12" record, titled Volume One, which was released under Grant and Siljamäki's alias Anjunabeats. As the label got the name Anjunabeats, they decided to produce under different aliases, such as Free State and Dirt Devils. They were soon joined by Tony McGuinness in 2000 after he was asked to collaborate on a remix of Chakra (trance duo) ‘Home’ and formed Above & Beyond.

In 2005, Above & Beyond launched the sub-label Anjunadeep aimed at releases that don't fit under the main label's trance focus, allowing more diversity within Anjunabeats. The trio also launched 2 other sub-labels, Anjunadigital that deals with special remixes and releases of Anjunabeats and Anjunadeep tracks, and Hard On Recordings that was active from 2000 to 2004 and focused on hard trance and hard house.

On 3 October 2017, Anjunabeats announced a collaboration with Beatport to host a production competition titled "Beats In School", in which the winner will earn a year-long mentorship with Anjunabeats artists. Canadian Joel Freck was named as the winner on 10 January 2018, among 20 contest finalists.

In March 2018, Anjunabeats launched a 24/7 radio station on YouTube, which features tracks from their label discography including trance and deep house.

Artists
Sources:

Awards

Anjunabeats was nominated at the International Dance Music Awards in Miami as Best Global Dance Record Label in the years 2009, 2010, 2012, 2015, and 2016. Three releases on the label were nominated for the Grammy Awards: Mat Zo's album Damage Control in 2015, and Above & Beyond's singles ″We're All We Need″ and "Northern Soul" in 2016 and 2019 respectively.

See also 
 List of record labels

References

External links
 Home page
 

British record labels
English electronic dance music record labels
Record labels established in 2004
Trance record labels